Deadworld is an EP only released in Japan by American heavy metal band Shadows Fall. The song "Stepping Outside the Circle" was re-recorded in 2002 for the band's third studio album The Art of Balance.

Track listing

Personnel
Shadows Fall
 Brian Fair – vocals
 Jonathan Donais – lead guitar, backing vocals
 Matt Bachand – guitar, backing vocals
 Paul Romanko – bass

Additional musicians
 Derek Kerswill – drums (tracks 1–2)
 David Germain – drums (tracks 3–5)

Production
 Tracks 1–2 produced by Zeuss and Shadows Fall, and engineered and mixed by Zeuss
Tracks 3–4 recorded live at WERS studio in Boston on April 16, 2000
Track 5 recorded live at CBGB in Manhattan on  November 26, 2000
 Artwork by Kirk Maetani, Satoshi Wakita, Maiko Tanimoto
 Photographs by Jiro Maetani

References

Shadows Fall albums
Century Media Records EPs
Metalcore EPs
Albums produced by Chris "Zeuss" Harris